Phycicoccus elongatus is a polyphosphate-accumulating bacterium. It is meso-diaminopimelic acid-containing, gram-positive, asporogenous oval- to rod-shaped and an aerobic chemoheterotroph.

References

Further reading

External links

LPSN
Type strain of Tetrasphaera elongata at BacDive -  the Bacterial Diversity Metadatabase

Intrasporangiaceae
Bacteria described in 2002